Françoise Dupont (fl. 1796), was a French militant Jacobin active during the French Revolution.

She was married to the soldier Barbant (Barbaux, Barbaut) and worked as a laundrywoman.

She came to be known as one of the most infamous female Jacobins in Paris during the Reign of Terror. She participated in the persecution if political dissidents and was active as an informer who reported suspected contra revolutionaries to the Committee of Public Safety, resulting in their arrest and executions by guillotine. Her reports are kept in the archives. Among them were the reports on the nuns of the Maison de Hospitalieres, who she reported as a government agent, having posed as a patient in their hospital. She has been referred to by contemporaries as one of the infamous tricoteuse, the female Jacobin fanatics, watched the executions of political prisoners while knitting.

After the fall of Robespierre, she participated in the Lagrelet conspiracy, when she encouraged and acted as the leader of starving women protestors to riot against the government. She was searched for by the authorities as one of the instigators, but avoided arrest by going in hiding. She benefitted from the amnesty of 1796.

References 

Jacobins
People of the Reign of Terror
Women in the French Revolution